The following table indicates the party of elected officials in the U.S. state of New York:
 Governor
 Lieutenant Governor
 Secretary of State (before 1927)
 Attorney General
 State Comptroller
 Treasurer (before 1927)

The table also indicates the historical party composition in the:
 State Senate
 State Assembly
 State delegation to the United States Senate
 State delegation to the United States House of Representatives (also see New York's congressional districts)

For years in which a presidential election was held, the table indicates which party's nominees received the state's electoral votes.

1777–1926

1927–present

References

See also
 Politics in New York
 Politics of New York (state)
 Elections in New York
 List of political parties in New York
 Political party strength in New York City

Politics of New York (state)
New York
Political parties in New York (state)